Silver Spurs is a 1943 American Western film directed by Joseph Kane.

Plot

Cast 
Roy Rogers as Roy Rogers
Trigger as Trigger, Roy's Horse
Smiley Burnette as Frog
John Carradine as Lucky Miller
Phyllis Brooks as Mary Johnson
Jerome Cowan as Jerry Johnson
Joyce Compton as Millie Love
Dick Wessel as Buck Walters
Hal Taliaferro as Steve Corlan
Forrest Taylor as Judge Pebble
Charles C. Wilson as Mr. Hawkins
Byron Foulger as Justice of the Peace
Bob Nolan as Bob, Leader of the Sons of the Pioneers
Sons of the Pioneers as Musicians, ranch hands

Soundtrack 
 "Tumbling Tumbleweeds" (Written by Bob Nolan)
 "Back in Your Own Backyard" (Written by Dave Dreyer, Billy Rose and Al Jolson)
 "Highways are Happy Ways (When They Lead the Way to Home)" (Music by Larry Shay, lyrics by Harry Harris and Tommie Malie)
 "When It's Springtime in the Rockies" (Music by Robert Sauer, lyrics by Mary Hale Woolsey)

External links 

1943 films
American black-and-white films
1943 Western (genre) films
Republic Pictures films
American Western (genre) films
Films directed by Joseph Kane
1940s English-language films
1940s American films